Bouraq Indonesia Airlines, often shortened to Bouraq Airlines or just Bouraq, was an airline headquartered in Jakarta, Indonesia, which operated mostly domestic passenger flights out of its bases at Soekarno-Hatta International Airport and Sultan Aji Muhammad Sulaiman Airport.

History

Bouraq Airlines was established in 1970 as a privately owned company by Jarry Albert Sumendap, and it stayed in the possession of his family ever since. It was named for al-Buraq, a flying horse in Muslim tradition. Bali Air was another airline owned by Sumendap, which was co-operating with Bouraq. Initially the airline operated Douglas DC-3s. From 1973 the turboprop Hawker Siddeley HS 748 was introduced on Bouraq services.

Both airlines were shut down in 2005 after prolonged financial problems. The last scheduled Bouraq flight took place in July 2005. The airline licence was later revoked in 2007.

Destinations

During the 1980s
At that time, Bouraq Airlines offered scheduled flights to the following destinations:

Balikpapan - Sultan Aji Muhammad Sulaiman Airport (main hub)
Bandung - Husein Sastranegara International Airport
Banjarmasin - Syamsudin Noor Airport
Bima - Bima Airport
Denpasar - Ngurah Rai International Airport
Gorontalo - Jalaluddin Airport
Jakarta - Soekarno–Hatta International Airport (secondary hub)
Kupang - El Tari Airport
Luwuk - Bubung Airport
Manado - Sam Ratulangi International Airport
Mataram - Selaparang Airport
Maumere - Wai Oti Airport
Palangkaraya - Tjilik Riwut Airport
Palu - Mutiara Airport
Pangkalan Bun - Iskandar Airport
Pangkal Pinang - Depati Amir Airport
Pontianak - Supadio Airport

Poso - Poso Airport
Samarinda - Temindung Airport
Sampit - Sampit Airport
Semarang - Achmad Yani International Airport
Surabaya - Juanda International Airport
Tanjung Redeb - Kalimarau Airport
Tarakan - Juwata Airport
Ternate - Babullah Airport
Toli-Toli - Lalos Airport
Ujung Pandang - Sultan Hasanuddin International Airport
Waingapu - Mau Hau Airport
Yogyakarta - Adisucipto International Airport

Tawau - Tawau Airport

Davao City - Francisco Bangoy International Airport

Singapore - Singapore Changi Airport

During the 2000s
Prior to the airline closure, the network had been reduced compared to the 1980s, due to the rising financial problems. In late 2004, Bouraq served the following destinations:

Balikpapan - Sultan Aji Muhammad Sulaiman Airport (hub)
Banjarmasin - Syamsudin Noor Airport
Batam - Hang Nadim Airport
Denpasar - Ngurah Rai International Airport
Jakarta - Soekarno–Hatta International Airport (hub)
Makassar - Sultan Hasanuddin International Airport
Manado - Sam Ratulangi International Airport
Palu - Mutiara SIS Al-Jufrie Airport

Surabaya - Juanda International Airport (hub)
Tarakan - Juwata Airport
Ujung Pandang - Sultan Hasanuddin International Airport
Yogyakarta - Adisucipto International Airport

Singapore - Singapore Changi Airport

Fleet

Over the years, Bouraq Indonesia Airlines operated the following aircraft types:

Accidents and incidents

Fatal
On 26 August 1980 at 06:29 local time, a Vickers Viscount of Far Eastern Air Transport (registered PK-IVS) crashed near Jakarta during a scheduled passenger flight from Banjarmasin that was operated on behalf of Bouraq, killed 31 passengers and 6 crew on board. The pilots had lost control of the aircraft over Tanjung Karawang whilst approaching Kemayoran Airport when the right elevator broke off. It was later determined that the fastenings had exceeded their lifetime by a factor of three without having been substituted during maintenance checkups.
On 9 January 1993, a Bouraq Hawker Siddeley HS 748 (registered PH-IHE) crashed near Juanda International Airport, killing 11 of the 39 passengers and 4 of the 5 crew on board. The aircraft had just left the airport for a scheduled flight to Banjarmasin, when a failure of the right side engine was experienced. The pilots tried to return to Juanda Airport, but ultimately failed to do so. The aircraft crashed into a swamp, broke in two and caught fire.
On 6 August 1995, a Bouraq HS 748 (registered PK-KHL) crashed into Mount Kumawa at a height of 2,800 metres, killing 4 passengers and 6 crew on board. The aircraft had been on a chartered flight from Dumatubin Airport to Kaimana Airport.

Non-fatal
On 23 January 1976, a Bouraq Hawker Siddeley HS 748 (registered PK-IHD) was damaged beyond repair in a landing accident at Mutiara Airport. None of the 27 passengers and 5 crew on board were seriously injured.
On 9 February 1977, another Bouraq HS 748 (this time registered PH-IHK) had to be written off after a hard landing at Sultan Hasanuddin International Airport, which caused the landing gear to collapse. Again, there are no reports concerning any injuries of the 46 passengers and 5 crew on board.
On 10 December 1982, the nose gear of a Bouraq HS 748 (registered PH-IHI) collapsed upon landing at Sam Ratulangi International Airport, causing the aircraft to veer off the runway. Even though the plane was destroyed, all of the 42 passengers and three crew survived.
On 4 July 1988, a Bouraq Vickers Viscount (registered PK-IVW) was damaged beyond economic repair when the starboard and nose gear collapsed during a tailwind landing at Sultan Aji Muhammad Sulaiman Airport. There were no notable injuries among the 71 passengers and 5 crew members on board
On 4 January 1989, a Bouraq HS 748 suffered extensive damage when the pilots had to perform a belly landing at Syamsudin Noor Airport, following a failure of the landing gears with 47 passengers and five crew on board.
On 28 August 1992, a Bouraq Vickers Viscount (registered PH-IVX) was destroyed in an engine fire at Syamsudin Noor Airport. The fire started during the take-off run, but the pilots noticed it in time to abort take-off and evacuate the 64 passengers (plus six crew), before the aircraft was engulfed by the flames.
On 26 September 1994, a Bouraq Viscount (registered PK-IVU) was damaged in a landing accident at Pontianak Airport during a ferry flight with only two pilots on board. The aircraft could be repaired and returned to service.
On 11 July 1996 at 09:00 local time, Bouraq lost another HS 748 (registered PK-IHN) in a runway overshot at Pattimura Airport. The pilots had to abort the take-off for a scheduled flight to Manado because of an engine failure, but the remaining length of the runway did not suffice to bring the aircraft to a halt, so that it collided with a dyke. There were no noteworthy injuries amongst the 43 passengers and five crew members.

References

External links

Bouraq Indonesia Airlines official website via archive.org

Defunct airlines of Indonesia
Airlines established in 1970
Airlines disestablished in 2005
2005 disestablishments in Indonesia
Indonesian companies established in 1970